Erzincan Dam is an embankment dam on Cardakli Creek in Erzincan, Turkey. The development was backed by the Turkish State Hydraulic Works.

See also
List of dams and reservoirs in Turkey

External links
DSI directory, State Hydraulic Works (Turkey), Retrieved December 16, 2009

Dams in Erzincan Province
Dams in the Euphrates River basin
Earth-filled dams
Dams completed in 2011